The 2020 I.ČLTK Prague Open is a professional tennis tournament played on outdoor clay courts. It was part of the 2020 ATP Challenger Tour. It took place in Prague, Czech Republic between 17 August and 6 September 2020.

ATP singles main-draw entrants

Seeds

1 Rankings are as of 16 March 2020.

Other entrants
The following players received wildcards into the singles main draw:
 Jonáš Forejtek
 Jiří Lehečka
 Andrew Paulson
 Michael Vrbenský
 Stan Wawrinka

The following players received entry into the singles main draw using a protected ranking:
 Arthur De Greef
 Andrey Kuznetsov

The following players received entry from the qualifying draw:
 Petr Nouza
 Jan Šátral

Champions

Men's singles

 Stan Wawrinka def.  Aslan Karatsev 7–6(7–2), 6–4.

Men's doubles

 Pierre-Hugues Herbert /  Arthur Rinderknech def.  Zdeněk Kolář /  Lukáš Rosol 6–3, 6–4.

References

External links
 Official website

2020 ATP Challenger Tour
Prague Open
Prague Open